Far West may refer to:

Places 
 Western Canada, or the West
 British Columbia Coast
 Western United States, or Far West
 West Coast of the United States
 American frontier, or Far West, Old West, or Wild West
 Far West (Taixi), a term used in East Asia that refers to Western Europe
 Far West, Missouri
 Far West, Austin, Texas
 Far West (New South Wales)
 Far-Western Development Region, Nepal
 The Palatine Barony of the Far West, a branch of the Society for Creative Anachronism, encompassing East Asia and the Pacific 
 al-Maghrib al-ʾAqṣā (the Farthest West)

See also 
 Farr West, Utah

In transportation 
 Farwest Airlines (airline code: FRW), a short-lived airline owned by Max and Thelma Biegert that operated in 1994 out of Fresno, California
 Far West (River Steamboat), a steamsboat on the Missouri River and the Yellowstone River in the 1870s and '80s, sometimes associated with the Battle of the Little Bighorn

In media 
 Far West (comics), a comic book by Richard Moore
 Far West (video game) is a German computer game released on May 2, 2002, created by Greenwood Entertainment and edited by JoWooD Productions
 Far West (film), a 1973 Belgian film
 Far West (role-playing game), a 1993 Spanish role-playing game published by M+D Editores

 FAR-West (music conference), Folk Alliance Region West